The Rocca di Novara (also called  “Rocca di Salvatesta” and “Cervino di Sicilia”) is a peak in the Peloritani mountains, situated in the northeastern part of Sicily, between the territories of Novara di Sicilia and Fondachelli-Fantina from where trails start to its top. It has an elevation of 1,340 meters above sea level. It resembles a Dolomites peak and because of this and the panoramic view from its summit it is a popular mountain with tourists. A summit cross with a figure of Jesus lies at its top. An annual pilgrimage to the summit is made by Christians on 18 August to celebrate a mass. Pits used by ancient people to collect snow for the summer remain on its slopes.
The walls of the mountain resemble a human face from a particular point of view and the ancient legend of buried treasure on it, discoverable by those who pass a series of trials, gives it an air of mystery. The mountain has been granted Site of Community Importance status.

References

Mountains of Sicily